Sangangüey is an eroded stratovolcano standing 2340 meters tall in the Trans-Mexican Volcanic Belt of Mexico. The volcano is located immediately southeast of Tepic in the state of Nayarit in Mexico. There has been no confirmed historical eruptions, although an Indian legend recorded the volcano erupting in 1742. The eruption is believed to be one occurring on a flank cinder cone on the volcano. Within the last 300,000 years however, the volcano has produced 45 cinder cones and lava flows.

References

Landforms of Nayarit
Stratovolcanoes of Mexico
Volcanoes of Nayarit
Pleistocene stratovolcanoes